Resnik railway station is a railway station of Belgrade railway junction, Belgrade–Niš and Belgrade–Bar railway. Located in Resnik, Rakovica, Belgrade. Railroad continues to Pinosava in one, in the other direction to  Bela Reka, in third direction to Rakovica, in fourth direction to Belgrade marshalling yard "A", in fifth direction to Ostružnica and the sixth direction towards to Belgrade marshalling yard "B" per irregular track via Junction "A" of Belgrade railway junction near Kneževac. Resnik railway station consists of 9 railway tracks.

See also 
 Serbian Railways

References 

Railway stations in Belgrade
Rakovica, Belgrade